The Fed One is a 1970 Yugoslav feature film directed by Vatroslav Mimica.

The film was selected for preservation by the Croatian State Archives.

References

External links

The Fed One at hrfilm.hr 

1970 films
Serbo-Croatian-language films
Films directed by Vatroslav Mimica
Jadran Film films
Croatian drama films
Croatian films based on plays
1970 drama films
Yugoslav drama films